Stanley Joseph Ott, S.T.D., (June 29, 1927 – November 28, 1992) was an American prelate of the Roman Catholic Church. He served as Bishop of Baton Rouge from 1983 until his death in 1992. He previously served as an auxiliary bishop of the Archdiocese of New Orleans from 1976 to1983.

Biography

Early life and education 
Stanley Ott was born in Gretna, Louisiana, the youngest of three children of Manuel Peter Оtt and his wife, Lucille Berthelot. He was a second cousin of Mel Ott, a New York Giants outfielder and member of the Baseball Hall of Fame. He received his early education at the parochial school of St. Joseph's Church in Gretna, where he also served as an altar boy. He then attended St. Aloysius High School in New Orleans. Following his graduation from St. Aloysius in 1944, he decided to study for the priesthood instead of entering the military service.

Ott attended St. Joseph Seminary College in Covington before entering Notre Dame Seminary in New Orleans. He continued his studies in Rome at the Pontifical North American College, where he studied at the Pontifical Gregorian University.

Priesthood 
While in Rome, Ott was ordained a priest by Archbishop Martin O'Connor on December 8, 1951. He earned a doctorate in theology from the Gregorian in 1954. Following his return to Louisiana, he was assigned as a curate at St. Frances Xavier Cabrini Parish in New Orleans, where he remained for three years. He served as an assistant chaplain at the Catholic Student Center of Louisiana State University in Baton Rouge from 1957 to 1961.

In 1961, after the creation of the Diocese of Baton Rouge, Ott became judicial vicar of the new diocese and a curate at St. Joseph Cathedral. He was named chancellor of the diocese in 1966 and rector of the cathedral in 1968. In addition to these duties, he also served as dean of the Central Deanery and a member of the diocesan college of consultors.

Auxiliary Bishop of New Orleans 
On May 24, 1976, Ott was appointed auxiliary bishop of the Archdiocese of New Orleans and titular bishop of Nicives by Pope Paul VI. He received his episcopal consecration on the following June 29 from Archbishop Philip Hannan serving as consecrator, with Archbishop William Borders and Bishop Joseph Sullivan as co-consecrators. The consecration was held at the Cathedral Basilica of St. Louis, King of France, in New Orleans. He was then appointed by Hannan as the vicar general of the archdiocese.

Bishop of Baton Rouge
Following the death of Sullivan in September 1982, Ott was named the third bishop of the Diocese of Baton Rouge by Pope John Paul II on January 13, 1983. During his nine-year tenure, he encouraged the increased participation of the laity in diocesan affairs, and promoted the ecumenical movement by engaging with leaders of other religions. He also oversaw a major reorganization of the Presbyteral Council and other diocesan structures.

An outspoken opponent of abortion, Ott urged Catholics to become involved in the pro-life movement and participated in Operation Rescue protests. In 1984, he received heavy criticism for conducting a Mass for executed murderer Elmo Patrick Sonnier. Ott served as chairman of the Committee on the Laity of the National Conference of Catholic Bishops and was a delegate to the World Synod of Bishops in 1987. He was a member of the Baton Rouge Sierra Club, Knights of Columbus, and Knights of the Holy Sepulchre.

Death and legacy 
In March 1991, Ott was diagnosed with inoperable liver cancer, which had spread to his spine by October of that year. He eventually lost the use of his legs, and underwent radiation treatment at Our Lady of the Lake Regional Medical Center in Baton Rouge. Stanley Ott died in Baton Rouge in September 1992 at age 65, and was buried in the cathedral cemetery.

Sources
 The Bishops of Baton Rouge, diobr.org – Roman Catholic Diocese of Baton Rouge website. Retrieved: 2010-06-03.

References

Episcopal succession

1927 births
1992 deaths
People from Gretna, Louisiana
Saint Joseph Seminary College alumni
Notre Dame Seminary alumni
Pontifical Gregorian University alumni
Roman Catholic Diocese of Baton Rouge
20th-century Roman Catholic bishops in the United States
Grand Priors of the Order of the Holy Sepulchre
Deaths from liver cancer
Burials in Louisiana
Catholics from Louisiana